Laguna San Rafael National Park is a park located on the Pacific coast of southern Chile. The park is named for the San Rafael Lagoon formed by the retreat of the San Rafael Glacier.

History

Non-indigenous people first explored the area of Laguna San Rafael in the year 1675. The glacier of the same name was a land-terminating glacier during that time. It probably reached again the lagoon at some time between 1741 and 1766, and it has been a tidewater glacier since that date.

The park was designated a World Biosphere Reserve by UNESCO in 1979.

Geography
The park comprises some of the higher Andes mountains of Patagonia, such as the Monte San Valentín, Cerro Arenales, Cerro Hyades and Cerro Pared Norte. 

This park contains a number of rivers. San Tadeo River is located in the Isthmus of Ofqui and flows into San Quintín Bay in the north part of the Gulf of Penas. Also there are various rivers bordering the park, such as the Baker River and the Exploradores River. Témpanos River (not really a river) connects San Rafael Lagoon with the Gulf Elefantes, the southern part of Moraleda Channel.

Presidente Ríos Lake spans the border between the park and Las Guaitecas National Reserve.

Climate

Going eastward, the amount of precipitation increases in the sheltered areas of the Chilean Inside Passage, being similar to that of Los Lagos Region.

Biology
As above-noted, the park is a World Biosphere Reserve by UNESCO.

Several species of birds find shelter in the park, including black-browed albatrosses, great grebes, black-necked swans and cormorants. 

Terrestrial and marine wildlife in this area also include South American gray fox, South Andean deer, Chilean dolphins, South American sea lions, marine otters, southern elephant seals, and so on. Baleen whales migrate into Gulf of Penas, and it is notable that the gulf is possibly a wintering/calving ground for the critically endangered population of Southern Right Whale.

See also

Torres del Paine National Park
Los Glaciares National Park

References

Biosphere reserves of Chile
Protected areas established in 1959
Protected areas of Aysén Region
National parks of Chile
Taitao Peninsula
1959 in Chilean law